Time Flies (stylized in sentence case) is the first greatest hits and second overall compilation album by Japanese idol girl group Nogizaka46. It was released on December 15, 2021, through N46Div., and Sony Music Records, two years and nine months after its predecessor studio album, Ima ga Omoide ni Naru made (2019) for the tenth-anniversary celebration of the group.

The album featured all their previous-released singles from the debut "Guruguru Curtain" to the latest "Kimi ni Shikarareta", including "Sekaijū no Rinjin yo", "Route 246", "Yukkuri to Saku Hana", and the lead single "Saigo no Tight Hug". Erika Ikuta, Mai Shinuchi, and Minami Hoshino participated as their last record from the group. Commercially, Time Flies debuted atop both the Oricon Albums Chart and Billboard Japan Hot Albums and certified platinum for physical release by Recording Industry Association of Japan (RIAJ), selling over 250,000 copies

Background

Nogizaka46, a Japanese idol girl group was formed on August 21, 2011, labelling as an "official rival of AKB48", and debuted on February 22, 2012, with the single "Guruguru Curtain". Until October 2021, they released four studio albums, one compilation album, and twenty eight singles, mostly peaked atop Japan Oricon Albums Chart and Singles Chart. The group marked their career success with concluding their summer national concert tour in 2017 at Tokyo Dome, participating NHK Kōhaku Uta Gassen for six consecutive years since 2015, and winning the grand prize from Japan Record Awards with their singles "Influencer" (2017) and "Synchronicity" (2018) for two consecutive years.

The album's title Time Flies means "time passes surprisingly quickly", which is a "perfect word" to describe 10-year period of the group. On October 26, Erika Ikuta, a first generation member announced to graduate from the group on December 31 on her official blog. She said the greatest hits album is her last record that will appear. Later, Ikuta serves as a center position of the lead single "Saigo no Tight Hug". On November 18, Mai Shinuchi, a second generation member, announced graduation from the group in late January 2022 on her radio show Nogizaka46's All Night Nippon. She revealed her graduation song, titled "Anata kara no Sotsugyō" for the first time on the radio show. The song will be included on Time Flies.

Release and promotion

Time Flies was released on December 15, 2021, in four editions: complete limited, first press limited, regular, and Sony Music Shop limited 10-anniversary member custom cover edition on CD, and Blu-ray (only complete limited and first press limited).
It compiled all Nogizaka46 singles from their first single "Guruguru Curtain" to the twenty-eighth single "Kimi ni Shikarareta". The previous-released charity single "Sekaijū no Rinjin yo", the digital single "Route 246", and the unreleased song sung by the second generation members "Yukkuri to Saku Hana" were also included. For digital music and streaming platform, Time Flies was released in 3 editions: complete, regular, and new song only.

The complete limited edition was additionally included the group's 150-minute-long documentary 10th Anniversary Documentary – 10nen no Ayumi, while the first press limited included was included the accompanying music videos for all new tracks, and  Shika-chan & Mot-chan no Dōga, behind-the-scene footages shot by the members.

Marketing

On October 10, 2021, 3:00 PM JST, Nogizaka46's YouTube channel Nogizaka Streaming Now started live streaming of Nogizaka46 Minutes, appeared Nogizaka46 members Manatsu Akimoto, Hinako Kitano, Minami Umezawa, and Haruka Kaki at Nogizaka area, which is the origin of the group's name, going to Nogizaka Station. They put up a promotional poster on the station's billboard to announce their tenth-anniversary greatest hits album, scheduled for release on December 15. To promote the album, the members announced a campaign to put up posters on billboards in all 38 stations with the ending word "-zaka" in Japan. Later the title Time Flies was announced on October 23.

The album's promotional poster shows six girls who show only the lower body walking and running with different costumes: from left to right student uniform, the group's purple tracksuit, "Kimi no Na wa Kibō" navy school uniform, "Kizuitara Kataomoi" purple dress, "Sayonara no Imi" red dress from 67th NHK Kōhaku Uta Gassen, "Influencer" violet outfit from 59th Japan Record Awards, and the group's "Kimi ni Shikarareta" current uniform, subtitled with the text "46 10th Anniversary BEST ALBUM 12.15 Wed on sale", that shows 10-year reminiscence of the group.

To commemorate the release of Time Flies, the members will be releasing the Nogizaka46 playlists, which were selected the group's song by each member and hashtagged # (Watashi no Nogizaka Besuto, "My Nogizaka Best") from November 8 to December 14, the day before the release date. On December 10, the purple lights–Nogizaka46's official color–lit up on Tokyo Tower for commemoration the album. The southern deck of the tower also showed the letter "46" (46 Best).

Cover artwork

The Sony Music Shop limited 10-anniversary member custom cover edition cover artworks of Time Flies for 37 members were revealed from October 27 to 31, 2021. They depict a member wearing the group's performance costume chosen by herself, who stands between blurred other two costumes.

All cover artworks of Time Flies except the Sony Music Shop limited cover were unveiled on November 8, showing lots of mannequins that wear Nogizaka46's performance costume and uniform taken at Nogizaka Station in the nighttime with dim light, which was based from their debut studio album Tōmei na Iro. For the complete limited, and first press limited edition, the mannequins were arranged in a row at the station's platform, while in the regular edition, the mannequins were not arranged near the paid area. These artworks were shot around mid-October by Yoshiharu Ōta, and handle the production by Takumi Kawamoto, Wataru Yoshida, and Noboru Wada, who worked with the first studio album.

Singles and other songs

"Saigo no Tight Hug" serves as a lead single of Time Flies. It was released on November 5, 2021, to digital music and streaming platforms. The song was written by Yasushi Akimoto, and composed by Katsuhiko Sugiyama. Erika Ikuta, who will be graduating from the group on December 31, serves as a center position of the song. The accompanying music video, directed by Kazuma Ikeda, was released on November 16.

Mai Shinuchi's graduation song "Anata kara no Sotsugyō" was unveiled on November 18, after her graduation from the group announcement. Other tracks were announced on the same day, including Ikuta's graduation song "Toki no Wadachi", and under members' track "Hard to Say". All tracks' music videos were teased on December 9.

Live performance

Nogizaka46 performed "Saigo no Tight Hug" for the first time at YTV's Best Hits Kayosai on November 11, 2021, alongside "Gomen ne Fingers Crossed". They will perform "Saigo no Tight Hug" at TBS's CDTV Live! Live! on November 15, which film at Tokyo National Museum, where is currently holding the group's exhibition, titled Shunkashūtō / Four Season Nogizaka46, alongside the special medley, titled Shunkashūtō Medley, consisting of "Harujion ga Sakukoro", "Jikochū de Ikō!", "Ima, Hanashitai Dareka ga Iru", and "Kaerimichi wa Tōmawari Shitaku Naru". The group performed the special medley, consisting of the songs released in 10 years: "Guruguru Curtain", "Girls' Rule", "Synchronicity", "Hadashi de Summer", and "Saigo no Tight Hug" on Nippon TV's Best Artist 2021 on November 17, as well as Shibuya Note on November 27. The group performed "Saigo no Tight Hug" at Fuji TV's FNS Music Festival on December 8, alongside Ikuta and Yuki Saito's collaboration "Sotsugyō".

Nogizaka46 members Erika Ikuta, Hina Higuchi, Shiori Kubo, Sakura Endō, and Haruka Kaki appeared on MTV's MTV Unplugged on December 11. The setlist was composed by Ikuta herself in an acoustic version, including "Hashire! Bicycle", "Gomen ne Fingers Crossed", and "Saigo no Tight Hug". The group performed "Influencer", "Synchronicity", and "Saigo no Tight Hug" at MTV Video Music Awards Japan 2021: The Live on December 18, which received MTV Pop the World Award. On December 24, the group performed the song at the 6-hour special edition of TV Asahi's Music Station, titled Music Station Ultra Super Live 2021, as well as Buzz Rhythm 02 along with "Sing Out!".

Accolades

Commercial performance

Time Flies debuted at number one on the Oricon Albums Chart, selling 282,222 copies in its first week, making it the group's sixth consecutive number-one album since their debut studio album Tōmei na Iro and the most consecutive number-one albums since a debut album in female group history. The album also entered Billboard Japan Hot Albums at number one, selling 281,946 copies (number one on the Top Albums Sales), and 2,179 download units (number two on the Download Albums). Time Flies certified platinum for physical release by RIAJ, surpassing 250,000 copies.

Track listing

Notes
 "Overture" is stylized in all caps.
 "Hard to Say" is stylized in sentence case.

Charts

Weekly charts

Monthly charts

Year-end charts

Certifications and sales

Release history

Notes

See also
List of Oricon number-one albums of 2021
List of Billboard Japan Hot Albums number ones of 2021

References

External links
 

2021 greatest hits albums
Japanese-language compilation albums
Nogizaka46 albums
Sony Music Entertainment Japan compilation albums